Bruce Yu-lin Hsiang is a Taiwanese esportist fighting games player who specializes in Street Fighter where he mains Adon and Elena in Ultra Street Fighter IV, and Necalli in Street Fighter V. Gamerbee is currently sponsored by ZOWIE. Gamerbee finished second at EVO 2015 after losing to Yusuke Momochi. He placed 13th at Capcom Cup 2015. Gamerbee was announced as one of the first two players for Red Bull Kumite 2016's Street Fighter V tournament.

Personal life

Prior to becoming a professional gamer, Hsiang worked in the hospitality industry. He revealed that he made around $1 million NTD in 2014 through prize money, streaming and sponsorship. In September 2015 he became Twitch's Partnerships Development Lead in Taiwan.

References

External links
 Twitter account
 Shoryuken rankings page

Living people
Fighting game players
Taiwanese esports players
Street Fighter players
Year of birth missing (living people)